The Federal Capital Territory Administration (FCTA) is a Nigerian ministry that administers the Federal Capital Territory of Nigeria.
It is headed by a Minister appointed by the President, assisted by a Permanent Secretary, who is a career civil servant. 

The Federal Capital Territory Administration was created by President Olusegun Obasanjo on December 31, 2004 following the scrapping of the Ministry of the Federal Capital Territory (MFCT). Seven new Mandate Secretariats were created for Education, Transport, Agriculture and Rural Development, Health and Human Services, Social development, Legal Services and Area Council. These  Secretariats were headed by non-career civil servants in an attempt to reduce administrative bottlenecks.

Several agencies are funded by the FCTA, including the Abuja Environmental Protection Board, concerned with waste collection and disposal and other environmental matters; the Abuja Geographical Information System, which provides a geo-spatial data infrastructure and a one stop for all land matters for the FCT, used to facilitate land acquisition and collect all land related revenue for the FCT; the Abuja Metropolitan Management Council (AMMC) for various municipal services; the Federal Capital Development Authority; and others.

Abuja Metropolitan Management Council 
The Abuja Metropolitan Management Council (AMMC) was created in 2010 to be responsible for "the efficient running and operation of municipal services within the FCT". It was created as corporation and governed by a board of directors comprising the FCT Minister as chairman, the Executive Secretary of the FCDA as vice chairman, a Co-ordinator, and five other part-time members appointed by the Minister. Members of the AMMC board may hold office for up to two periods of four years each, although they may be dismissed and replaced by the FCT minister at any time. The chief executive officer of the council has the title of Director-General, and is appointed by the president of Nigeria.

Departments of Parks and Recreation, Development Control, Facilities Maintenance and Management, Road Traffic Services, and Urban Affairs were created for the council at the time of the AMMC's creation.

Federal Capital Development Authority 
The Federal Capital Development Authority was created in 1976 to "oversee the infrastructural and physical development (planning, design and construction)" of the FCT. Three years later   the "Ministry of the Federal Capital Territory" (MFCT) was created, and subsequently the two organizations largely merged. However the MFCT was superseded in 2004 with the establishment of the Federal Capital Territory Administration.

See also
 Federal Ministries of Nigeria
 List of Ministers of the Federal Capital Territory (Nigeria)
 Nigerian Civil Service

References

Federal Ministries of Nigeria
Ministries established in 2004
2004 establishments in Nigeria